Bahrain National Stadium (transliterated: Stād al-Bahrayn al-Watanī) is the national stadium of Bahrain, located in Riffa. It can accommodate 24,000 spectators and is used mostly for football matches.

It was built in 1982 and was renovated in December 2012 for the 21st Arabian Gulf Cup.

Pope Francis held a holy papal mass on November 5th, 2022 in the Bahrain National Stadium, which was temporarily refitted to accommodate the event. The mass was attended by members of the public and was conducted in the presence of King Hamad bin Isa Alkhalifa. A temporary center stage was set up in the stadium to host the Pope and the King during the mass. This marks the first time that a Pope has conducted a mass in Bahrain, and the event was widely publicized and covered by media outlets around the world. The papal mass was part of Pope Francis' efforts to promote interfaith dialogue and cooperation.

References

External links

Bahrain National Stadium at World Stadiums
Bahrain National Stadium at Fussballtempel.net

Football venues in Bahrain
Athletics (track and field) venues in Bahrain
National stadiums
1982 establishments in Bahrain
Sports venues completed in 1982
Riffa